Parma is a city in Canyon County, Idaho, United States. The population was 1,983 at the 2010 census, up from 1,771 in 2000. It is the fourth largest city in the county (behind Middleton, Caldwell, and Nampa all in the county’s eastern portion) and the largest in the rural western portion. It is part of the Boise City–Nampa, Idaho Metropolitan Statistical Area.

The city was named after Parma, Italy.

Geography

Demographics

2010 census
As of the census of 2010, there were 1,983 people, 710 households, and 506 families living in the city. The racial makeup of the city was 75.4% White, 0.4% African American, 1.2% Native American, 0.7% Asian, 20.0% from other races, and 2.4% from two or more races. Hispanic or Latino of any race were 31.0% of the population.

There were 710 households, of which 37.3% had children under the age of 18 living with them, 51.7% were married couples living together, 13.5% had a female householder with no husband present, 6.1% had a male householder with no wife present, and 28.7% were non-families. 24.6% of all households were made up of individuals, and 10.2% had someone living alone who was 65 years of age or older. The average household size was 2.77 and the average family size was 3.31.

The median age in the city was 34.9 years. 30.1% of residents were under the age of 18; 7.8% were between the ages of 18 and 24; 24.1% were from 25 to 44; 24.2% were from 45 to 64; and 13.8% were 65 years of age or older. The gender makeup of the city was 50.6% male and 49.4% female.

2000 census
As of the census of 2000, there were 1,771 people, 617 households, and 454 families living in the city. The racial makeup of the city was 83.91% White, 0.17% African American, 0.85% Native American, 0.96% Asian, 9.66% from other races, and 4.46% from two or more races. Hispanic or Latino of any race were 27.10% of the population.

There were 617 households, out of which 38.2% had children under the age of 18 living with them, 60.3% were married couples living together, 9.2% had a female householder with no husband present, and 26.4% were non-families. 23.0% of all households were made up of individuals, and 14.1% had someone living alone who was 65 years of age or older. The average household size was 2.85 and the average family size was 3.41.

In the city, the population was spread out, with 31.4% under the age of 18, 7.8% from 18 to 24, 26.9% from 25 to 44, 19.1% from 45 to 64, and 14.9% who were 65 years of age or older. The median age was 33 years. For every 100 females, there were 97.9 males. For every 100 females age 18 and over, there were 94.7 males.

The median income for a household in the city was $31,964, and the median income for a family was $36,336. Males had a median income of $26,167 versus $18,636 for females. The per capita income for the city was $11,861. About 11.7% of families and 15.0% of the population were below the poverty line, including 13.9% of those under age 18 and 28.9% of those age 65 or over.

Notable people
 Jimmy Johnston, football player with Washington Redskins (1939–40), born in Parma
 Jerry Kramer, football player with Green Bay Packers (1958–68), Parma area resident following his playing career, elected to the Pro Football Hall of Fame in 2018 
 C. Ben Ross, first native-born Governor of Idaho, served as governor from 1931 until 1937; born in Parma.
 Edgar Rice Burroughs, creator of Tarzan and John Carter of Mars. Worked as a city councilman for Parma when he lived there while working on his family's gold dredges.

See also

 List of cities in Idaho

References

External links

 

Boise metropolitan area
Cities in Idaho
Cities in Canyon County, Idaho